Sobasina aspinosa is a species of jumping spider.

Name
The epitheton aspinosa "spineless" refers to the absence of spines from the legs.

Distribution
Sobasina aspinosa is known from the islands of Viti Levu and Vanua Levu in Fiji.

References
  (1998): Salticidae of the Pacific Islands. III.  Distribution of Seven Genera, with Description of Nineteen New Species and Two New Genera. Journal of Arachnology  26(2): 149-189. PDF

Salticidae
Endemic fauna of Fiji
Spiders of Fiji
Spiders described in 1998